Itäkeskus metro station (- "Eastern Center") is a ground-level station on the Helsinki Metro. The station was built on the grounds of the shopping center Itis, and serves the quarter of Itäkeskus in the neighborhood of Vartiokylä in East Helsinki. There are 240 bicycle and 420 car parking spaces at the station. Itäkeskus is served by both M1 and M2 and acts as an exchange station between the two, as it is the easternmost station to be shared by both lines.

Itäkeskus is one of the original stations on the system, and was opened on 1 June 1982. It was designed by Jaakko Ylinen and Jarmo Maunula. Itäkeskus is located 2.1 kilometers east of Siilitie metro station, 1.9 kilometers south of Myllypuro metro station, and 1.0 kilometers south-west of Puotila metro station.

Itäkeskus station is unique in the sense that it is the only station on the Helsinki metro that has 3 platforms. It is also one of the two stations on the network at which trains' doors open on the "wrong" side - on the right instead of the left. This only occurs on track 1 when facing Vuosaari and Mellunmäki, and one track 2 (which is rarely used) facing Helsinki and Matinkylä. The only other station with this arrangement is Kalasatama.

References

External links

Helsinki Metro stations
Railway stations opened in 1982
1982 establishments in Finland